FPAA may refer to:

 Fairmount Park Art Association, Philadelphia  
 Field-programmable analog array, an integrated device containing and interconnecting between configurable analog blocks
Film Production Association of Australia, now Screen Producers Australia